is a village located in Asakura District, Fukuoka Prefecture, Japan.

The village was founded on March 28, 2005 by the merger of the villages of Hōshuyama and Koishiwara, both from Asakura District.

The village is a production centre of Koishiwara ware.

As of April 1, 2017, the village has an estimated population of 2,063 and a density of 40 persons per km². The total area is 51.93 km².

References

External links

Tōhō official website 

Villages in Fukuoka Prefecture